Exco Technologies Limited is a Canadian global designer, developer, and manufacturer of dies, molds, components, assemblies, and consumable equipment. This equipment is made for the die-cast, extrusion, and automotive industries. This company has 19 manufacturing locations in 10 countries and approximately 5,000 employees. It is incorporated and domiciled in Canada.

References

External links
 Official site

Companies listed on the Toronto Stock Exchange
Companies based in Markham, Ontario